The Venetian Interdict of 1606 and 1607 was the expression in terms of canon law, by means of a papal interdict, of a diplomatic quarrel and confrontation between the Papal Curia and the Republic of Venice, taking place in the period from 1605 to 1607. While it was active, the Interdict saw expulsions of some religious orders from Venice, a pamphlet war, and intense diplomacy by France and Spain to resolve the issue. Paolo Sarpi was one of the most prominent Venetian figures involved in the interdict.

Background
There had been previous interdicts laid on Venice. In 1202 the Venetian siege of Zadar during the Fourth Crusade led Pope Innocent III to excommunicate the army. In 1284, Pope Martin IV imposed an interdict because of Venice's refusal to support a crusade. Pope Clement V addressed escalating measures against Venice after the 1308 capture of Ferrara; and later in the War of Ferrara of the 1480s Pope Sixtus IV laid an interdict on Venice, an erstwhile ally. In 1509 Pope Julius II placed Venice under interdict, during the War of the League of Cambrai, to further the papal cause in warfare in the Romagna.

Course of events
In 1605 Venice took measures to counter a papal attack on the way the Republic exerted control over its Catholic clergy. Pope Paul V treated Venice's approach, on civil jurisdiction over clerics and church property, as anti-clerical; Leonardo Donato, an opponent of papal power, was elected Doge early in 1606.

Based on the case current at the time of two arrested clerics, the Pope issued an interdict against Venice in April 1606. In diplomatic moves, Philip III of Spain encouraged the Papacy to press its case; while Henry IV of France supported Venice.

Military buildup
The estimate in Rome was that the forces required to prosecute the conflict militarily were 50,000 infantry with 4,000 cavalry; beyond the papal pocket. Philip III ordered Pedro Henriquez de Acevedo, Count of Fuentes in Milan to readiness, with the required cavalry and about half the infantry. Paul V called in Alfonso d'Avalos, a Spanish colonel based in Milan, to oversee, and Alessandro Monti from Flanders to command, his forces. Henry IV started to raise troops; he was able to match the Spanish forces well enough, and had Philippe Canaye propose to the Venetian Senate a plan of encouraging the Grisons to invade the Milan province.

Resolution
War threatened, but the French were not clearly prepared to fight over the matter, as the Spanish were. As this became apparent, Henry's diplomacy was able to resolve the immediately contentious matters. His objective all along was to play the peacemaker and gain influence in Italy, this approach being at odds in the end with Canaye's pro-Venetian posture. Canaye moved to press the Venetians to accept mediation by Cardinal François de Joyeuse. The interdict was lifted and formal reconciliation occurred in April 1607, with de Joyeuse as cardinal legate taking custody of the two priests at the centre of the dispute in his accommodation in the upper loggia at the Fondaco dei Turchi on the 21st.

However the interdict had prompted a ban from the territories of the Venetian Republic of the Jesuits, and this continued until 1656/7, when it ended as part of the reconciliation of another period of disputes between the Republic and the Papacy.

Evaluations
Bouwsma states that, while the outcome was satisfactory to Venice, this event also marks the beginning of the decline of the Republic. John A. Marino writes that the polemical exchanges on theories of statehood, by their intellectual depth, were influential for future discussions well into the 17th century.

This was the last example of a papal interdict applied to an extended region, though interdicts have been used subsequently on a local scale.

References
William J. Bouwsma (1968), Venice and the Defense of Republican Liberty. University of California Press.
Filippo De Vivo "'Information and Communication in Venice: Rethinking Early Modern Politics.'" Oxford: Oxford University Press, 2007

Notes

External links
The Venetian Interdict and the Problem of Order
John C. Rao, 2004 article on the Interdict in the Seattle Catholic

History of the papacy
History of Venice
1606 in international relations
1606 in Italy
17th-century Catholicism
1600s in the Republic of Venice